Bahera is a town in the state of Bihar, India. It is covered under the district Darbhanga.

See also 
 Railway stations in India
 Antour
 Ashapur

References 

Villages in Darbhanga district